Joilto dos Santos Bonfim (born 11 February 1965) is a retired Brazilian athlete who specialised in the sprint hurdles. He represented his country at the 1992 Summer Olympics as well as four consecutive World Championships starting in 1987. In addition, he won multiple medals on regional level.

His personal bests are 13.67 seconds in the 110 metres hurdles (Brasilia 1992) and 7.98 seconds in the 60 metres hurdles (Budapest 1989).

His brother Jailto Bonfim was also an Olympic athlete.

International competitions

1Disqualified in the final

References

All-Athletics profile

1965 births
Living people
Brazilian male hurdlers
Brazilian male sprinters
Athletes (track and field) at the 1992 Summer Olympics
Olympic athletes of Brazil
Athletes (track and field) at the 1991 Pan American Games
Pan American Games athletes for Brazil
Competitors at the 1987 Summer Universiade
20th-century Brazilian people